Dorothy Hobson (born 11 November 1946) is a Jamaican former cricketer who played primarily as a right-arm off break bowler. She appeared in five One Day Internationals for Jamaica at the 1973 World Cup, and four Test matches and two One Day Internationals for the West Indies between 1976 and 1979. She also played domestic cricket for Jamaica.

Career 
Hobson batted in the middle-order, and bowled right-arm off break. In 1973, she was a member of the Caribbean Women's Cricket Federation, which aimed to make tours more affordable for the countries in the West Indies. Hobson captained the Jamaican team. In 1976, Hobson was included in the first ever West Indies women squad.

Hobson was a coach of the West Indies team at the 1993 Women's Cricket World Cup. In 2013, Hobson became the first ever coach of a Melbourne Cricket Club camp. In 2015, Hobson helped relaunch the Jamaica Women's Cricket League, which had not been held for five years beforehand. As of 2017, Hobson works as the chief selector for the West Indies women's team, and also the manager of the Melbourne women's cricket team.

References

External links 
 
 

1946 births
Living people
West Indies women Test cricketers
West Indies women One Day International cricketers
Jamaican women cricketers